The National Research Centre is an Egyptian research and development center for multiple disciplines including agriculture, chemistry, biology, medicine, engineering and genetics. It was established in 1956 "to foster basic and applied scientific research, particularly in industry, agriculture, public health and other sectors of national economy". The NRC is the largest institution affiliated with the ministry of Scientific Research. It has a research staff of 4847 scientists and is headed by a president with two vice presidents for research and technical affairs.

Divisions
The NRC is divided into 14 Divisions and 111 Departments. The following are all the divisions in the NRC:
 Agriculture and Biology Research Division
 Chemical Industries Research Division
 Engineering Research Division
 Environmental Sciences Research Division
 Food Industry and Nutrition Division
 Genetic Engineering and Biotechnology Division
 Inorganic Chemical Industries and Mineral Resources Division 
 Medical Sciences Division
 Pharmaceutical Industries Division
 Physics Division
 Textile Industries Division
 Veterinary Research Division
 Human Genetics & Genome Researches
 Oral & Dental Research Division

References

External links
 Official Website

Research institutes in Egypt
Educational institutions established in 1956
1956 establishments in Egypt
Science and technology in Egypt
Government agencies of Egypt